Purash-Kanpur Haridas Nandi Mahavidyalaya, established in 1966, is an undergraduate college in Purash, in Howrah district, India.  It is affiliated with the University of Calcutta.

Departments

Science
Chemistry
Physics
Mathematics
Computer Science
Botany
Zoology

Arts and Commerce
Bengali
English
History
Political Science
Philosophy
Commerce

Accreditation
Puras-Kanpur Haridas Nandi Mahavidyalaya is recognized by the University Grants Commission (UGC). Recently, it has been re-accredited and awarded B grade by the National Assessment and Accreditation Council (NAAC).

See also 
List of colleges affiliated to the University of Calcutta
Education in India
Education in West Bengal

References

External links

Educational institutions established in 1966
University of Calcutta affiliates
Universities and colleges in Howrah district
1966 establishments in West Bengal